Matt Gray (born 25 September 1980) is a former Democratic member of the Colorado House of Representatives. Gray represented District 33, which covered Broomfield and portions of Boulder County. He was first elected in 2016, succeeding Dianne Primavera.

A Broomfield resident, Gray was a deputy district attorney before taking office. He has also served as vice chair of the Adams County Youth Initiative and chair of the Broomfield Board of Equalization.

Gray served on the House Business Affairs and Labor Committee, the House Finance Committee, and the House Local Government Committee.

Elections
Gray was elected to the House of Representatives in 2016, winning with 52.16% against Republican opponent Karen Nelson.

DUI arrest
Gray was arrested on April 21, 2022 on suspicion of driving under the influence. The arrest took place in front of an elementary school in Broomfield, Colorado, which is in the legislative district Gray represents. Gray is a former prosecutor in Colorado's 17th judicial district, the district in which the arrest occurred.

References

External links
Official campaign website

21st-century American politicians
Democratic Party members of the Colorado House of Representatives
People from Broomfield, Colorado
Living people
1980 births
Year of birth uncertain